Aesthetic Theory: Essential Texts is an anthology of the most important texts written on aesthetics and beauty since Plato till nowadays.

It is edited by the theorist Mark Foster Gage who is tenured associate professor at the Yale University. The book is made up of twenty chapters each about an influential figure in the field of aesthetics. Also, the editor himself has added some descriptions before each chapter, summarizing how each figure`s thought could be relater to contemporary thinking.

Summary 
Covering the history of aesthetic philosophy since the ancient Greek up to 21st century, the twenty chapters includes texts from thinkers as diverse as Plato, Aristotle, Vitruvius, Alberti, Kant, Edmund Burke, Konrad Fiedler, Nietzsche, Oscar Wilde, Henri Bergson, Clive Bell, Geoffrey Scott , Walter Benjamin, Georges Bataille, Susan Sontag, Frederic Jameson, Elaine Scarry , Alexander Nehamas, Nick Zangwill, and David Freedberg & Vittorio Gallese.

The selection mostly focuses on the issue of the form in visual arts and tries to question the prevailing practice of only qualifying our work based on concepts and in abstract terms.

In the preface of the book we read:

References 

2011 non-fiction books
English non-fiction books
Books in art